The 2012–13 Connecticut Huskies men's basketball team represented the University of Connecticut in the 2012–2013 NCAA Division I basketball season. The Huskies split their home games between the XL Center in Hartford, Connecticut, and the Harry A. Gampel Pavilion on the UConn campus in Storrs, Connecticut. The Huskies are a member of the Big East Conference. This season marked the first for new head coach Kevin Ollie, a former Husky, who replaced Jim Calhoun, who retired in September 2012 after 26 seasons as head coach.

Previous season
The Huskies finished the 2011–12 season 20-14 overall, including 8–10 in Big East play.  The Huskies, reigning champions of the 2011 NCAA Men's Division I Basketball Tournament were eliminated in the first round of the 2012 tournament by a number-8-seeded Iowa State.

Preseason developments
After the 2011–12 season, the Huskies were barred from postseason play for 2012–13 due to several years of poor Academic Progress Rate (APR) scores. They had already lost two scholarships for the 2011–12 season due to APR sanctions. As a result of the postseason ban, rising senior forward Alex Oriakhi announced he would transfer to Missouri for his final season of eligibility. Under NCAA rules, he can play immediately at Missouri because Connecticut's postseason ban covers his entire remaining eligibility.

Two other players transferred. Redshirt freshman Michael Bradley initially planned to transfer to Western Kentucky, but was denied immediate eligibility by the NCAA, and chose instead to transfer to Vincennes, an Indiana junior college. Rising junior Roscoe Smith was released from his scholarship and ultimately transferred to UNLV.

Departures

Roster

Regular season 

The Huskies traveled to St. Thomas for the Paradise Jam tournament in mid-November. UConn faced Wake Forest in the first round and won 77–71. The second game matched the Huskies against in-state Quinnipiac, coached by Tom Moore, who spent 13 years  as a member of the UConn coaching staff. UConn found itself in a ten-point deficit with under five minutes to go, and managed to tie the score by the end of regulation. The game went to two overtimes before UConn prevailed 89–83.

In the Championship game, UConn came from nine points down to take a brief two-point lead with just over two minutes to go, but gave up nine straight points, and ended up with the loss 66–60. The Lobos hit all 21 of their free throw attempts in the game, leaving UConn in the runner-up position.

Schedule 

|-
!colspan=9| Exhibition

|- 
!colspan=9| Regular Season

Rankings

See also
 2012–13 Connecticut Huskies women's basketball team

References

UConn Huskies men's basketball seasons
Connecticut
Connecticut Huskies men's basketball team
Connecticut Huskies men's basketball team